Carleton may refer to:

Education establishments 
Carleton College, a liberal arts college in Northfield, Minnesota, United States
Carleton School in Bradford, Massachusetts, United States
Carleton University, a university in Ottawa, Ontario, Canada
Ottawa-Carleton District School Board

Human names 
Carleton (surname)
Baron Carleton
Carleton (given name)

Places

Canada 
 Ontario:
 Carleton (Ontario electoral district) (1867–1966, 2015–present)
 Carleton (Ontario provincial electoral district) (1867–1995, 2018–present)
Carleton County, Ontario (historic)
Carleton Place, Ontario
West Carleton Township, Ontario
 Carleton Ward of Ottawa, AKA College Ward 
 New Brunswick:
Carleton, New Brunswick, now part of Saint John
Carleton Parish, New Brunswick, in Kent County
 Carleton (New Brunswick federal electoral district) (1867–1914)
 Carleton (New Brunswick provincial electoral district) (1995–present)
Mount Carleton, New Brunswick
Mount Carleton Provincial Park
 In other provinces:
Carleton, Nova Scotia
The Carleton, a building in Halifax, Nova Scotia
Borden-Carleton, Prince Edward Island
 Carleton-sur-Mer 5th largest town of the Gaspésie's Baie des Chaleurs

New Zealand
Carleton, New Zealand, locality in the Waimakariri District

United Kingdom 
Carlton, Bedfordshire, previously spelled Carleton
Carleton, Copeland, a village near Drigg, Cumbria
Carleton, Eden, a village in Eden, Cumbria, on the edge of Penrith
Carleton, Carlisle, a hamlet near Carlisle, England
Carleton, Lancashire, near Blackpool
East Carleton, Norfolk
Carleton Rode, Norfolk
Carleton St Peter, Norfolk
Carleton, North Yorkshire near Skipton
Carleton, West Yorkshire, a small village on the outskirts of Pontefract

United States 
Carleton, Michigan
Carleton, Nebraska

Other 
Carleton Life Support, makers of scuba gear
Carleton Ravens, the athletic teams that represent Carleton University in Ottawa
Carleton's Raid, 1778 raid during the American War of Independence

See also 
 Carlton (disambiguation)